Two People may refer to:
 Two People (1924 film), a German silent film by Hanns Schwarz
 Two People (1930 film), a German film by Erich Waschneck
 Two People (1952 film), a West German film by Paul May
 Two People (1973 film), a 1973 American film by Robert Wise
 Two People (band), a 1980s UK musical duo
 "Two People" (song), a 1986 song by Tina Turner
 Two People (novel), a 1911 work by Richard Voss